The 2006 BFGoodrich Langstreckenmeisterschaft (BFGLM) season was the 29th season of the VLN.

Calendar

Race Results
Results indicate overall winners only.

References

External links 
 
 

2006 in German motorsport
Nürburgring Endurance Series seasons